The 2017 United States Senate special election in Alabama took place on December 12, 2017, to fill a vacancy in the U.S. Senate through the end of the term ending on January 3, 2021. The vacancy arose from Jeff Sessions' resignation, on February 8, 2017, to serve as the 84th United States attorney general. Democratic candidate Doug Jones defeated Republican candidate Roy Moore by a margin of 21,924 votes (1.63%). Jones became the first Democrat to win a U.S. Senate seat in Alabama since 1992.

On February 9, 2017, Governor Robert J. Bentley appointed Luther Strange, the attorney general of Alabama, to fill the vacancy until a special election could take place. Bentley controversially scheduled the special election to align with the 2018 general election instead of sooner. When Kay Ivey succeeded Bentley as governor, she rescheduled the special election for December 12, 2017.

Jones, a former U.S. attorney for the Northern District of Alabama, won the Democratic primary election. Moore, a former chief justice of the Supreme Court of Alabama, competed with Strange and U.S. Representative Mo Brooks in the August 15, 2017 Republican primary; the two highest vote-getters, Moore and Strange, advanced to a runoff. President Donald Trump supported  Strange during the primary runoff, in addition to much of the Republican establishment in the Senate, including Senate Majority Leader Mitch McConnell, who made the success of Strange's candidacy a major priority. Trump's efforts on behalf of Strange included tweeting and a rally in Huntsville, Alabama. Vice President Mike Pence campaigned for Strange as well. With McConnell's help, Strange outspent Moore by a margin of 10-to-1. However, Moore won the primary runoff on September 26, 2017. This was the first time that an incumbent U.S. senator having active White House support lost a primary since Arlen Specter lost to Joe Sestak in 2010.

In mid-November 2017, multiple women alleged that Moore had made unwanted advances or sexual assaults on them when he was in his early thirties and they were in their teens (the youngest was 14 at the time), attracting widespread national media coverage of the election. As a result of these allegations, many national Republican leaders and office holders called for Moore to withdraw from the special election or rescinded their endorsements of him. However, Donald Trump and many Alabama Republicans reaffirmed their support. At the time of the revelations, it was too late to remove his name from the ballot. Many Republican leaders proposed shifting their support to a write-in candidate such as Strange. Moore has stated that he never engaged in sexual misconduct, although he has not denied that he approached or dated teenagers over the age of 16 while he was in his 30s (sixteen is the legal age of consent in Alabama). In late November, retired Marine Colonel Lee Busby launched a write-in campaign.

At 9:23 p.m. CST, the Associated Press called the election for Jones, though Moore refused to concede. Jones was the first Democratic candidate to win a statewide election in Alabama since former Lieutenant Governor Lucy Baxley was elected president of the Alabama Public Service Commission in 2008. Jones was sworn into office on January 3, 2018, becoming the first Democratic U.S. senator from Alabama since Howell Heflin's retirement in 1997.

Background

Potential appointees
Following then-President-elect Donald Trump's nomination of then-Senator Sessions to be U.S. attorney general, Robert Aderholt, a member of the United States House of Representatives, had asked to be appointed to the seat. Representative Mo Brooks had also expressed interest in the seat, while Strange had stated before being selected that he would run for the seat in the special election whether or not he was appointed. Other potential choices Bentley interviewed for the appointment included Moore;  Del Marsh, the president pro tempore of the Alabama Senate; and Jim Byard, the director of the Alabama Department of Economic and Community Affairs.

Republican primary

Campaign
The Republican primary attracted national attention, especially following Trump's endorsement of incumbent Senator Luther Strange. Strange was backed by several key figures within the Republican establishment, most notably Senate Majority Leader Mitch McConnell. His two main rivals in the primary consisted of former state judge Roy Moore and Mo Brooks. While Strange showed no signs of losing the first round of the primary, almost every opinion poll showed him trailing Roy Moore in a runoff. Strange came in second place in the first round of the primary behind Roy Moore, securing a spot in the runoff.

National interest in the race dramatically increased in the month before the runoff. Strange maintained his endorsement from Trump, who campaigned for him in Huntsville during the closing days of the campaign. Trump's endorsement of Strange sparked criticism among his own base, many of whom preferred Moore and detested Strange for his seemingly establishment feel. Several notable people close to Trump broke from the president to endorse Moore, including HUD Secretary Ben Carson and Breitbart Executive Chairman Steve Bannon. Despite the endorsement of Trump, Strange was handily defeated by Roy Moore in the runoff.

Candidates

Nominated
 Roy Moore, former chief justice of the Alabama Supreme Court and candidate for governor in 2006 and 2010

Eliminated in runoff 
 Luther Strange, incumbent U.S. senator (appointed) and former attorney general of Alabama

Eliminated in primary
 James Beretta, physician
 Joseph F. Breault, Air Force chaplain and nominee for the Utah House of Representatives in 2016
 Randy Brinson, gastroenterologist and activist
 Mo Brooks, U.S. representative
 Dom Gentile, businessman
 Karen Jackson, attorney and perennial candidate
 Mary Maxwell, candidate for NH-02 in 2006
 Bryan Peeples, businessman
 Trip Pittman, state senator

Withdrew 
 Ed Henry, state representative (withdrew from race on May 17).

Declined

 Robert Aderholt, U.S. representative
 Slade Blackwell, state senator
 Bradley Byrne, U.S. representative
 Bill Hightower, state senator
 Perry Hooper Jr., former State Representative
 Mary Scott Hunter, member of the Alabama State Board of Education
 Del Marsh, president pro tempore of the State Senate
 Jonathan McConnell, businessman and candidate for the U.S. Senate in 2016
 John Merrill, secretary of state of Alabama

 Glenn Murdock, associate justice of the Alabama Supreme Court
 Gary Palmer, U.S. representative
 Jimmy Rane, businessman
 Martha Roby, U.S. representative
 Mike Rogers, U.S. representative
 Connie Rowe, state representative
 Cam Ward, state senator
 Jim Zeigler, Alabama state auditor

Endorsements 

{{Endorsements box
| title = Mo Brooks
| list =
U.S. representatives
 Mark Meadows, U.S. representative (R-NC) and chairman of the House Freedom Caucus
 Mike Rogers, U.S. representative (R-AL)
 Lamar S. Smith, U.S. representative (R-TX)
State representatives
 Ed Henry, state representative and chairman of Donald Trump's Alabama campaign
Organizations
 Courageous Conservatives PAC
 FreedomWorks
 Gun Owners of America
 Senate Conservatives Fund
 Students for Trump
Individuals
 Ann Coulter, conservative commentator
 Sean Hannity, conservative talk radio host and host of Hannity
 Laura Ingraham, conservative talk radio host
 Mark Levin, conservative talk radio host
}}

First round

 Polling 
{| class="wikitable" 
|- valign= bottom
! Poll source
! Date(s)administered
! Samplesize
! Marginof error
! style="width:55px;"| JamesBeretta
! style="width:55px;"| JosephBreault
! style="width:55px;"| RandyBrinson
! style="width:55px;"| MoBrooks
! style="width:55px;"| MaryMaxwell
! style="width:55px;"| RoyMoore
! style="width:55px;"| BryanPeeples
! style="width:55px;"| TripPittman
! style="width:55px;"| LutherStrange
! Undecided
|-
| Trafalgar Group (R) 
| align=center| August 12–13, 2017
| align=center| 870
| align=center| ± 3.3%
| align=center| 1%
| align=center| 1%
| align=center| 6%
| align=center| 17%
| align=center| 1%
|  align=center| 38%
| align=center| 1%
| align=center| 6%
|  align=center| 24%
| align=center| 5%
|-
| Emerson College 
| align=center| August 10–12, 2017
| align=center| 373
| align=center| ± 5.0%
| align=center| 1%
| align=center| 0%
| align=center| 0%
| align=center| 15%
| align=center| 0%
|  align=center| 29%
| align=center| 0%
| align=center| 10%
|  align=center| 32%
| align=center| 11%
|-
| Trafalgar Group (R)
| align=center| August 8–10, 2017
| align=center| 1,439
| align=center| ± 2.6%
| align=center| 1%
| align=center| 1%
| align=center| 4%
| align=center| 20%
| align=center| 2%
|  align=center| 35%
| align=center| 1%
| align=center| 6%
|  align=center| 23%
| align=center| 8%
|-
| Cygnal (R)
| align=center| August 8–9, 2017
| align=center| 502
| align=center| ± 4.4%
| align=center| –
| align=center| –
| align=center| 2%
| align=center| 18%
| align=center| –
|  align=center| 31%
| align=center| –
| align=center| 7%
|  align=center| 23%
| align=center| 13%
|-
| Strategy Research
| align=center| August 7, 2017
| align=center| 2,000
| align=center| ± 2.0%
| align=center| 1%
| align=center| 1%
| align=center| 1%
| align=center| 19%
| align=center| 4%
|  align=center| 35%
| align=center| 1%
| align=center| 9%
|  align=center| 29%
| align=center| 0%
|-
|JMC Analytics (R)
| align=center| August 5–6, 2017
| align=center| 500
| align=center| ± 4.4%
| align=center| –
| align=center| –
| align=center| 2%
| align=center| 19%
| align=center| –
|  align=center| 30%
| align=center| –
| align=center| 6%
|  align=center| 22%
| align=center| 17%
|-
|RRH Elections (R)
| align=center| July 31 – August 3, 2017
| align=center| 426
| align=center| ± 5.0%
| align=center| –
| align=center| –
| align=center| 2%
| align=center| 18%
| align=center| –
|  align=center| 31%
| align=center| –
| align=center| 8%
|  align=center| 29%
| align=center| 11%
|-
| Strategy Research
| align=center| July 24, 2017
| align=center| 3,000
| align=center| ± 2.0%
| align=center| 1%
| align=center| 1%
| align=center| 2%
| align=center| 16%
| align=center| 5%
|  align=center| 33%
| align=center| 2%
| align=center| 5%
|  align=center| 35%
| align=center| –
|-
| Cygnal (R)
| align=center| July 20–21, 2017
| align=center| 500
| align=center| ± 2.0%
| align=center| –
| align=center| –
| align=center| –
| align=center| 16%
| align=center| –
|  align=center| 26%
| align=center| –
| align=center| –
|  align=center| 33%
| align=center| –

 Results 

 Runoff 
President Donald Trump supported Strange during the primary runoff, and almost the whole national Republican establishment were supporting Strange's campaign. Trump's efforts on behalf of Strange included a rally in Alabama, plus tweeting.

Debates
 Complete video of debate, September 21, 2017

 Averages 

 Polling 

 Results 

Democratic primary

Candidates

Nominated
 Doug Jones, former United States attorney for the Northern District of Alabama

Eliminated in primary
 Will Boyd, pastor, former Greenville, Illinois city councilman, nominee for AL-05 in 2016 and write-in candidate for the U.S. Senate from Illinois in 2010
 Vann Caldwell, Talladega County constable and perennial candidate
 Jason Fisher, businessman
 Michael Hansen, activist and nonprofit executive
 Robert F. Kennedy Jr., digital marketing executive for a laboratory supply company (no relation to the Massachusetts Kennedy family)
 Charles Nana, candidate for the U.S. Senate in 2016

Withdrew
 Ron Crumpton, activist, nominee for the state senate in 2014 and nominee for the U.S. Senate in 2016
 Brian McGee, retired teacher and Vietnam War veteran

Declined
 Roger Bedford, former state senator and nominee for the U.S. Senate in 1996
 Elaine Beech, state representative
 Sue Bell Cobb, former chief justice of the Supreme Court of Alabama
 Chris England, state representative
 Craig Ford, state representative
 Gary Johnson, minister and political activist
 Walt Maddox, mayor of Tuscaloosa
 Terri Sewell, U.S. representative

Endorsements

Polling
{| class="wikitable" 
|- valign= bottom
! Poll source
! Date(s)administered
! Samplesize
! Marginof error
! style="width:75px;"| WillBoyd
! style="width:75px;"| VannCaldwell
! style="width:75px;"| JasonFisher
! style="width:75px;"| MichaelHansen
! style="width:75px;"| DougJones
! style="width:75px;"| RobertKennedy Jr.
! style="width:75px;"| CharlesNana
! Undecided
|-
| Emerson College 
| align=center| August 10–12, 2017
| align=center| 164
| align=center| 
| align=center| 8%
| align=center| 2%
| align=center| 1%
| align=center| 0%
|  align=center| 40%
|  align=center| 23%
| align=center| 1%
|  align=center| 25%
|-
|Strategy Research
| align=center| August 7, 2017
| align=center| 2,000
| align=center| 
| align=center| 9%
| align=center| 5%
| align=center| 3%
| align=center| 7%
|  align=center| 30%
|  align=center| 40%
| align=center| 5%
| align=center| –
|-
| Strategy Research
| align=center| July 24, 2017
| align=center| 3,000
| align=center| 
| align=center| 6%
| align=center| 4%
| align=center| 4%
| align=center| 4%
|  align=center| 28%
|  align=center| 49%
| align=center| 5%
| align=center| –

 Results 

Independents and write-in candidates
Candidates
Declared
 Ron Bishop (L, write-in)
 Lee Busby (R, write-in), retired Marine colonel
 Jeff "Cog" Coggin (I, write-in), Air Force veteran
 Chanda Mills Crutcher (I, write-in), minister
 Eulas Kirtdoll (I, write-in)
 Arlester "Mack" McBride (I, write-in)
 Mac Watson (R, write-in)

Declined
 Craig Ford, Democratic State representative

General election

Controversies
Roy Moore sexual misconduct allegations

On November 9, The Washington Post reported that four women had accused Roy Moore of engaging in sexual conduct with them when they were teenagers and he was an assistant district attorney in his thirties. One of the women was 14 years old at the time, below the legal age of consent. A few days later a fifth woman said that she had received unwanted attention from Moore when she was 15 years old, and that in December 1977 or January 1978, when she was 16, Moore sexually assaulted her. Moore denied the allegations.

After this, certain Republican leaders and conservative organizations withdrew their endorsements of Moore or asked him to drop out of the campaign. These included Texas Senator Ted Cruz, U.S. Attorney General and former seat holder Jeff Sessions, Ivanka Trump, the National Republican Senatorial Committee, former Republican presidential nominees Mitt Romney and John McCain, Republican Senate Majority Leader Mitch McConnell, Ohio Governor John Kasich, Utah Senator Mike Lee, Montana Senator Steve Daines, and House Representatives Barbara Comstock, Carlos Curbelo, and Adam Kinzinger, as well as the Young Republican Federation of Alabama. The state’s senior Senator Richard Shelby also refused to endorse Moore. Other conservative websites and organizations such as National Review'' urged readers not to vote for Moore. Despite this, Moore continued to receive support from the state party and a week before the election, President Donald Trump strongly endorsed Moore. Following Trump's endorsement, the RNC reinstated their support for him, and Republican leaders said they would "let the people of Alabama decide" whether to elect Moore.

At the time of the revelations, it was too close to the election for Moore's name to be removed from the ballot. Republican officials proposed various ways to promote an alternate Republican candidate. One suggestion was to ask Governor Kay Ivey to delay the special election until 2018, but Ivey said she had no plans to change the election date. Some Republicans such as Senator Lisa Murkowski floated the prospect of a write-in campaign to elect Luther Strange, with Utah Senator Orrin Hatch actively endorsing a write-in campaign for Strange. However, Strange said it was "highly unlikely" that he would run a write-in campaign. Senate Majority Leader Mitch McConnell proposed Attorney General Jeff Sessions, who formerly held the Senate seat, as a write-in candidate. In late November, Retired Marine Col. Lee Busby launched a write-in campaign stating that he thought there is room for a centrist in the race.

Debates
Republican nominee Roy Moore refused to debate Democratic nominee Doug Jones. Moore turned down debate invitations extended by the League of Women Voters, WHNT-TV and AL.com. Jones' campaign said that Jones was "willing to debate Roy Moore anytime, anywhere" and accused Moore of "hiding from the voters, from the media and from his record for weeks." Moore and his campaign stated that he refused to debate Jones because their policy positions were already clear to voters and thus there was no need for a formal debate.

Predictions

Candidates

On ballot
 Doug Jones (D), former United States attorney for the Northern District of Alabama
 Roy Moore (R), former chief justice of the Supreme Court of Alabama

Write-in
 Ron Bishop (L)
 Lee Busby (R)
 Jeff "Cog" Coggin (I)
 Chanda Mills Crutcher (I)
 Eulas Kirtdoll (I)
 Arlester "Mack" McBride (I)
 Mac Watson (I)

Endorsements

Polling

* Unpublished poll released on December 15

with Roy Moore on ballot and Luther Strange as write-in candidate

{| class="wikitable"
|- valign= bottom
! style="width:120px;"| Poll source
! style="width:140px;"| Date(s)administered
! Samplesize
! Margin
! style="width:100px;"| RoyMoore (R)
! style="width:100px;"| DougJones (D)
! style="width:100px;"| LutherStrange (R)
! Other
! Undecided
|-
| Opinion Savvy
| align=center|November 9, 2017
| align=center|515
| align=center|± 4.3%
| align=center| 41%
|  align=center| 44%
| align=center| 12%
| align=center| 1%
| align=center| 2%

with Luther Strange on ballot
{| class="wikitable"
|- valign= bottom
! style="width:120px;"| Poll source
! style="width:140px;"| Date(s)administered
! Samplesize
! Margin
! style="width:100px;"| LutherStrange (R)
! style="width:100px;"| DougJones (D)
! Other
! Undecided
|-
| rowspan=2| Fox News
| align=center rowspan=2| November 13–15, 2017
| align=center| 649 LV
| align=center| ± 3.5%
| align=center| 38%
|  align=center| 48%
| align=center| 3%
| align=center| 5%
|-
| align=center| 823 RV
| align=center| ± 3.0%
| align=center| 39%
|  align=center| 46%
| align=center| 3%
| align=center| 6%
|-
| Emerson College
| align=center| September 21–23, 2017
| align=center| 519
| align=center| ± 4.3%
|  align=center| 49%
| align=center| 36%
| align=center| –
| align=center| 15%
|-
| Emerson College
| align=center| September 8–9, 2017
| align=center| 416
| align=center| ± 4.8%
|  align=center| 43%
| align=center| 40%
| align=center| –
| align=center| 17%

with generic Republican/Democrat

Results

Doug Jones defeated Roy Moore by a margin of 21,924 votes. Voter turnout was 40.54% of Alabama's 3,326,812 registered voters.

Jones won primarily by running up huge margins in the state's major cities. The state's four largest counties—Jefferson (home to the state's largest city of Birmingham), Mobile (home to Mobile), Madison (home to Huntsville), and Montgomery (home to the state capital of Montgomery)—all gave Jones 56 percent or more of the vote. He carried Jefferson by over 83,800 votes, and Montgomery by almost 30,500 votes; either county would have been more than enough to give him the victory. Jones also dominated the Black Belt. Jones took 61% of votes from voters under 45. He also took over 96 percent of the Black vote. While Moore dominated the state's rural areas outside of the Black Belt, he significantly underperformed Trump's totals in those areas, as well as the suburbs such as traditional GOP fortress Shelby County, which Moore won narrowly.

As of December 15, Moore demanded a recount and refused to concede the race, despite being urged by Trump, Bannon, and others to concede. In Alabama, if the final margin of victory is less than 0.5%, then a recount is automatically triggered. If not, then either candidate can request a recount at their own expense. However, Alabama Secretary of State John Merrill estimated that a recount could cost anywhere from $1 million to $1.5 million, an amount that would have had to be paid in full when the request is made. Moore had only $636,046 on hand by the time the campaign ended. A number of right-leaning websites pushed conspiracy theories about voter fraud providing the margin for Jones. Merrill noted on December 20 that the only outstanding ballots were 366 military ballots and 4,967 provisional ballots; even if all those votes were for Moore, it would not have been enough to trigger an automatic recount.

Because the number of write-in votes was larger than Jones' margin of victory, the names written in were both counted and listed. Luther Strange, who lost the Republican primary to Moore, received the most write-in votes, followed by former White House aide Lee Busby, U.S. Rep. Mo Brooks, who also ran in the Republican Senate primary, Libertarian write-in candidate Ron Bishop, and Attorney General Jeff Sessions. Nick Saban, Alabama's head coach, finished in seventh with more than 250 votes.

After the election, Moore filed a lawsuit attempting to block the state from certifying the election and calling for an investigation into voter fraud. On December 28, 2017, a judge dismissed this lawsuit and state officials certified the election results, officially declaring Doug Jones the winner. Jones was sworn into office on January 3, 2018, by Vice President Mike Pence. Jones became the first Democrat to win a statewide race in Alabama since former Lieutenant Governor Lucy Baxley was elected president of the Alabama Public Service Commission in 2008 over Republican Twinkle Andress Cavanaugh. Prior to that, Democrat Jim Folsom Jr. was elected Lieutenant Governor of Alabama in 2006 over Republican Luther Strange. The last Democrat to win a federal statewide election in Alabama was Richard Shelby in 1992, who switched to the Republican Party in late 1994.

By congressional district
Despite his statewide win, Jones only won one district.

Results by county

Voter demographics

See also 
 2010 United States Senate special election in Massachusetts
 2016 United States Senate elections

References

External links
Official campaign websites
 Lee Busby (R) for Senate
 Ron Bishop (L) for Senate
 Jeff Coggin (I) for Senate
 Chanda Mills Crutcher (I) for Senate
 Doug Jones (D) for Senate
 Arlester McBride (I) for Senate
 Roy Moore (R) for Senate
 Mac Watson (R) for Senate
 Official Sample Ballot

United States Senate special
December 2017 events in the United States
Roy Moore
Alabama 2017
2017 special
Alabama special
Alabama 2017
United States Senate 2017